A1 Team Singapore is the A1 Grand Prix national team representing Singapore. Singapore took part in this competition for the first time in its history in October 2006. Christian Murchison, Denis Lian and Hafiz Koh were the original drivers for the team. The team was launched on 19 September 2006 by sports minister Vivian Balakrishnan, with West Surrey Racing to run the car.

The future of the Singapore A1 team is in doubt for the third season, with both drivers Denis Lian and Hafiz Koh already being dropped from the team in season 2.

No-show
After participating in the A1 Grand Prix Race of South Africa held in Durban, the Singapore A1 Grand Prix team has not raced in all of the subsequent legs, namely the Mexican, Chinese (Shanghai) and British A1 Grand Prixs. This is due to an injury suffered by their one and only driver, Christian Murchison, in the South African leg of the season.

Drivers

Complete A1 Grand Prix results 

(key), "spr" indicate a Sprint Race, "fea" indicate a Main Race.

References

Singapore A1 team
National sports teams of Singapore
Motorsport in Singapore
Auto racing teams established in 2006
Auto racing teams disestablished in 2007